Franco Alessandro Laguna Correa was born in Buenos Aires, Argentina and has the Mexican nationality. He is a writer, ethnographer, musician/composer, and college professor also known for his heteronyms "Dr. Crank," "Crank,", "Sardine", "f.l Crank," "Gaetano Fonseca" and "Mehmet Amazigh." He has been included by literary critics, in the so-called New Latino Boom, which is a literary movement that features 21st-century Latin American fiction authors writing in Spanish in the United States.

He was awarded in 2012 the National Literary Prize of the North American Academy of the Spanish Language (ANLE), an institution based in New York City. In 2013, he received the International Poetry Prize of the Autonomous University of Aguascalientes. In 2016, Laguna Correa was one of the recipients of The Fuerza Award, a social recognition for his intellectual activism in the Pittsburgh area granted by The City of Pittsburgh, the collective Café con Leche, and The Latin American Cultural Union (LACU). The Chicago Review of Books recommended his book Crush Me (a broken novel) for the 2017 National Poetry Month.

His novel Wild North was included in the list of best Mexican fiction of 2017 selected by author Antonio Ortuño and published in the daily newspaper El Informador.

He has been invited to deliver talks about his research at various institutions, including Emory University, the University of California, Texas State University, and Duke University.

Education & Teaching 

He graduated from the Escuela Nacional Preparatoria in 2001 after being forced to interrupt his studies due to the 1999 UNAM strike. He began his university studies at The School of Philosophy and Letters and The School of Political and Social Sciences of the National Autonomous University of Mexico, which is often cited as the most prestigious university of the Spanish-speaking world.

He completed his undergraduate education at Portland State University, where he received a double BA in Liberal Studies and Literature. In addition, he completed a Master of Fine Arts at the University of Pittsburgh and two M.A. degrees, one in Social Anthropology and another in Philosophy, both at the Autonomous University of Madrid.

He was the recipient in 2014 of the K. Leroy Irvis Fellowship at the University of Pittsburgh, and in 2016 he received a doctoral degree (Ph.D.) in Cultural and Literary Studies from the University of North Carolina at Chapel Hill. Thereafter, he held researching and teaching appointments at High Point University and the University of Denver.

Music & Sonic Endeavors 
Over the course of the last three years, Franco Alessandro has devoted extensive time to the composition and performance of various forms of sonic and musical ensembles. Besides taking singing lessons both in Europe and the United States, he has taken his theoretical interests in sonic borderspaces to the realm of music creation. He has recorded a few symphonic pieces that feature only vocal acoustic renderings of his voices. Based on his personal interests and recorded pieces, Franco Alessandro has termed his music as "sonic realities" and his personal performative style as "Post-Modern Troubadour". Franco Alessandro is also the creator of NUCLEAR ZOUND (bandlab.com/nuclearzound).

Musical Compositions 

ULTRA/SONIC (AI QUATTRI STAGIONI)
REQUIEM FOR AN ODYSSEY
ALL I WANT FOR CHRISTMAS IS YOU
ALL THE LUMINOUS AETHER IS AL/READY IN US

Literary & Civic Awards 

(2016) The Fuerza Award (Pittsburgh)

(2013) International Poetry Prize of the Autonomous University of Aguascalientes (Aguascalientes)

(2012) National Literary Prize of the North American Academy of the Spanish Language (New York City)

The Immigration Quartet 

Wild North (novel) is the first piece of the series The Immigration Quartet. The second is the experimental and fragmented novella, which uses stylistic techniques from prose poetry, Crush Me/(broken novel) that Laguna Correa wrote in English and that in 2013 was awarded the International Poetry Prize of the Autonomous University of Aguascalientes. In 2017 the independent publisher, based in Chicago, Radical Narratives released the book and that same year the Chicago Review of Books included Crush Me  in their list of books to celebrate the National Poetry Month. The third book of the series is the noir novel of suspense Ortodoxa: contra-manual, which was one of the finalists of the Equis Prize of Novel in 2015, subsequently in 2018 the publisher, based in Miami, Suburbano Ediciones published Ortodoxa. The last book of the "Immigration Quartet" is the testimonial and semi-autobiographic novel of suspense, torture and psychological realism Acedia, published in California by Rayo Press in 2020.

Bibliography 
Novellas and novels 
(2020) The Invisible Militia, Radical Narratives, Chicago. (published with the heteronym "Dr. Crank") 
(2020) Acedia, Rayo Press, California. (published with the heteronym "f.l. Crank") 
(2020) Diario supino, Rayo Press, California. (published with the heteronym "f.l. Crank") 
(2017) Crush Me: Ría Brava (a broken novel), Radical Narratives, Chicago. (published with the heteronym "f.l. Crank") 
(2018) Ortodoxa (contra-manual), Suburbano Ediciones, Miami. 
(2016) Wild North, Rayo Press, Tamaulipas. 

Short Stories
(2020) Historia de un hombre devastado por el siglo XX, Rayo Press, California. (published with the heteronym "F. Laguna Correa") 
(2020) Memoria de una alarma contra incendios, Rayo Press, California. (published with the heteronym "F. Laguna Correa") 
(2020) Cambio de piel, Rayo Press, California. (published with the heteronym "F. Laguna Correa") 
(2020) Sentencia definitiva, Rayo Press, California. (published with the heteronym "F. Laguna Correa") 
(2011) Crítica literaria y otros cuentos, Editorial Paroxismo, Carolina del Norte/Ciudad de México. 

Flash-fictions
(2012) Finales felices, Academia Norteamericana de la Lengua Española, New York City. 
(2020) Federratas (finales felices), Rayo Press, California. (published with the heteronym "F. Laguna Correa") 

Poetry
(2020) Requiem for The Unhappy, Radical Narratives, Chicago. (published with the heteronym "f.l. Crank") 
(2020) Poesía Temprana (2005-2012), Miglior Fabbro Eds., Portugal (Entroncamento), Sicilia (Mazzara del Vallo), Valparaíso (Zacatecas, Mexico). (published with the heteronym "Gaetano Fonseca") 
(2020) Testament. (volume 1), Radical Narratives, Chicago. (published with the heteronym "Dr. Crank") 

Essays
(2020) Essays on Pop Culture, Sonic Modernity, The Anthropocene, and Artificial Intelligence, Free Press, Manchester, UK. (published with the heteronym "F. Laguna Correa") 
(2020) La vida después del presente: La irrupción de la Inteligencia Artificial en la vida cotidiana, Pensamiento Libre, Santiago de Chile, Buenos Aires. (published with the heteronym "F. Laguna Correa") 
(2020) Distorsiones y encubrimientos: Crítica al campo intelectual en México, Pensamiento Libre, Santiago de Chile, Buenos Aires. (published with the heteronym "F. Laguna Correa") 
(2020) Fuera de México (Ensayos), Pensamiento Libre, Santiago de Chile, Buenos Aires. (published with the heteronym "F. Laguna Correa") 
(2020) El intelectual en su tiempo: Un acercamiento cognitivo al pensamiento político, histórico e intelectual de Lucas Alamán, Pensamiento Libre, Santiago de Chile, Buenos Aires. (published with the heteronym "F. Laguna Correa") 
(2020) Esclavitud en Tabasco durante el Porfiriato, Pensamiento Libre, Santiago de Chile, Buenos Aires. (published with the heteronym "F. Laguna Correa") 
(2020) Utopía poética, impotencia amorosa e imaginación temporal en María Luisa Bombal, Pablo Neruda y Mario Benedetti, Pensamiento Libre, Santiago de Chile, Buenos Aires. (published with the heteronym "F. Laguna Correa") 

Memoir
(2020) Portable Museum: Lighter Than Air (a memoir), Real Time, New York City. (published with the heteronym "f.l. Crank") 

Hybrid Genres 
(2020) Pedagogy for (all): Reading Lessons, Thinking Books, Lagos, Nigeria. (published with the heteronym "Dr. Crank") 
(2020) The Book Where You Surrender, Radical Narratives, Chicago. (published with the heteronym "Dr. Crank") 
(2014) Resquebrajadura: deforme y mutilado, este relato, Editorial Paroxismo, Carolina del Norte. 

Aphorism 
(2020) Aphorism(s), Radical Narratives, Chicago. (published with the heteronym "Dr. Crank")

References 

Postmodern writers
Argentine male writers
Living people
1986 births